Chamel Roukoz  is a Lebanese politician, former brigadier general and former member of parliament. From May 2018 to 2022, he was a member of parliament who represented the Byblos–Keserwan district. Roukoz is also the son-in-law of President Michel Aoun, the founder of the FPM. Before retiring, Roukoz was the oldest commander of the Rangers Regiment and was spoken of as a potential candidate for the post of Lebanese Armed Forces Commander.

Military career
During the Liberation war, under the leadership of Prime Minister General Aoun, Roukoz fought the Syrian forces and their Lebanese militia allies which were assaulting the “free zones” of East Beirut. During Summer 2007, he gained recognition as a brilliant Officer during the 15-week operation against Fatah al-Islam in Nahr al-Bared camp northern Lebanon. In addition, General Roukoz, fought Ahmed al-Assir and his supporters during the Battle of Sidon in 2013. He also led the battles against Jabhat al-Nusra and  Islamic State of Iraq and the Levant during the Battle of Arsal and battle of Rass Baalbak.

Awards
For his distinguished military achievements. General Roukoz awarded the National Order of Merit (Officer) by the President of France as well as the  Order of Charles III Encomienda de Número (Commander by Number) by the king of Spain.

Civil–Rangers relations
According to Roukoz, the Lebanese people support is the strongest weapon to the Army. Thus, every year since 2008, the Rangers Regiment organizes unique mountain races open to both the military and civilians. Barracks to Barracks is the longest race with a participation of thousands of people from different nationalities. The races have also ecological and touristic goals. See Rangers Events.

Personal life
Roukoz has been married to Claudine, daughter of the Lebanese President Michel Aoun until they divorced in 2022. They have two sons.

References 

Lebanese Maronites
Brigadier generals
Lebanese military personnel
1958 births
Living people